Tom Langridge was an association football manager of the 1940s.

In 1947, he was manager of the Australian national team in a game against South Africa. The match, which was the last in a series of five, took place in Sydney and ended in a 2–1 loss for the Australians.

Managerial statistics

References

Australia national soccer team managers
Year of birth missing
Year of death missing
Australian soccer coaches